György Miklós Jakubinyi (born 13 February 1946) is a Romanian cleric, the former archbishop of the Roman Catholic Archdiocese of Alba Iulia. Born into an ethnic Hungarian family in Sighetu Marmației, he attended school in his native town from 1952 to 1963 before beginning his religious training that year at the Roman Catholic Theological Institute of Alba Iulia. Ordained a priest in 1969 by Áron Márton, he was consecrated auxiliary bishop at Șumuleu Ciuc in 1990. The following year, he became administrator of the Ordinariate for Catholics of Armenian Rite in Romania. He was made archbishop in 1994, and retired in 2019.

Notes

External links
 http://www.catholic-hierarchy.org/bishop/bjakub.html

21st-century Roman Catholic archbishops in Romania
Romanian religious leaders of Hungarian descent
People from Sighetu Marmației
1946 births
Living people
Roman Catholic Archdiocese of Alba Iulia